Nangamangalam is a village in the Chittoor district of Andhra Pradesh in India.

History

The village supposedly came up around 500 years back when a few people belonging to Reddy community from Guntur and Nellore came and settled here, which was then an area under the rule of Bommi Naidu, who ruled Vellore.

Administration

The village comes under the Gudipala Mandal of Chittoor District and falls under the Chittoor assembly constituency and Chittoor parliamentary constituency.

Demographics

Telugu is official language of this village.

The table below shows the demographic details of Nangamangalam.

References

External links

Villages in Chittoor district